Adversarial journalism refers to a kind of journalism or a journalistic role where the journalist adopts an oppositional and combative style of reporting and interviewing. The goal of adversarial journalism is to reveal supposed wrongdoings of actors under investigation. Instead of being completely impartial, adversarial journalists take sides in what they believe to be true. They deliberately combine information with commentary or opinion in their writing. In particular, adversarial journalists remain relentlessly hostile and highly skeptical regarding government, big business companies, and political events, questions, institutions and personalities. Adversarial journalism is thought to be traditional in liberal democracies where journalism is regarded as a "Fourth Estate" (the fourth pillar of a democracy). It is also considered an extreme form of participant journalism or advocacy journalism. It has been contrasted with public or civic journalism.

Criticism
Critics of adversarial journalism have characterized it as overly aggressive, rude, brash, arrogant, antagonistic and cynical. They argue that the selective nature of information and partisan or biased commentary inherent in adversarial journalism have the potential to be transformed into propaganda. This, in turn, can increase people's distrust in media and at the same time deteriorate the quality of public discussion. According to critics, the non-deferential nature of adversarial journalism can foment public cynicism about the functioning of big government organizations and eventually erode their trust in democracy. They state that it is too preoccupied with scandals and strategies rather than political substance. Former executive editor of the American daily newspaper The New York Times Bill Keller contends that journalists, as a matter of institutional discipline, must try to suspend their opinions, aspire to be impartial and let the evidence speak for itself so that readers can decide for themselves. For Keller, journalists who are forthcoming about their subjective views are more likely to manipulate the facts to fit their chosen narrative out of pride.

Support
Proponents of adversarial journalism, however, argue that it does not abandon verifying what is true. According to them, adversarial journalists do not manipulate any facts, but at the same time they are bold enough to accuse the people who they believe are worthy of blame. American independent investigative journalist I. F. Stone stated in the 1970s that "the first" of "the basic assumptions" for journalists covering politics to "operate on" is that "every government is run by liars, and nothing they say should be believed." 

According to self-styled adversarial journalist Glenn Greenwald, the two-fold mission of journalism is "informing the public of accurate and vital information, and its unique ability to provide a truly adversarial check on those in power." Greenwald has described "fearless, adversarial journalism" to be necessary to "bring transparency and accountability to powerful governmental and corporate institutions." According to Greenwald, despite the institutionally objective tone promoted by big media institutions, the public hold these outlets with very low esteem. To Greenwald, journalism is inherently subjective and the pretense of objectivity or impartiality can be harmful because it promotes false equivalence and a superficially impartial journalist who hides their views can manipulate the reader who is unaware of those hidden views. For Greenwald, journalism requires fairness and rigorous adherence to facts, but at the same time, journalists must be forthcoming about their perspectives and subjective assumptions.

Regarding journalistic objectivity, I. F. Stone said in 1989 that "the conventions of the Washington press corps—its proximity to power, its glorification of official sources, its presumption of objectivity—left it vulnerable to manipulation..." According to him, "objectivity is fine if it's real. Every society has its dogmas, and a genuinely objective approach can break through them. But most of the time objectivity is just the rationale for regurgitating the conventional wisdom of the day." American sociologist Christian Smith wrote in 2010 that mainstream journalists who want to follow the norm of being "responsible, ...objective, balanced, value-free" and "politically neutral", thus avoiding "any hint of 'adversarial' or 'advocacy' journalism" focus less, in practice, on "in-depth analytical interpretation of events", depending heavily on so-called official news sources such as government spokespeople, political and business leaders and academic experts. The opposing sides of any issue presented by them are "limited to the officially acceptable views of Republican-versus-Democrat, conservative-versus-liberal, defense attorney-versus-prosecuting attorney", etc. American investigative journalist Matt Taibbi wrote in the Rolling Stone magazine in 2013 that "'Objectivity' is a fairy tale invented purely for the consumption of the credulous public....journalists can strive to be balanced and objective, but that’s all it is, striving....Try as hard as you want, a point of view will come forward in your story." He adds that "No matter how it’s presented, every report by every reporter advances someone’s point of view." In a podcast interview given to Canadian media outlet Canadaland in 2017, American foreign war correspondent and investigative journalist Jeremy Scahill said that "objectivity for the sake of objectivity often means make sure that the powerful always get their say. And sometimes Caesar shouldn’t have his say. Sometimes the truth is just true."

In an article published in Current Affairs in February 2022, British-American journalist Nathan J. Robinson writes that it is vitally important to have "a strong adversarial press that investigates government claims and checks whether they are supported by evidence." In particular, Robinson states that journalists need to be especially critical towards a government's justifications to start a war with another nation and hold them in highest scrutiny, as "war is the greatest horror human beings are capable of producing."

History and current state

United States
The origin of adversarial journalism in the United States can be traced back to the investigative journalism in the late 18th century, when newspapers started doubting governmental actions and looked for  information from other sources. This trend continued in the 19th century, when cheap and mass-produced tabloid-style newspapers collectively called the Penny press from the 1830s reinforced the idea that journalism could serve public interest and not just special interests of government, business, or powerful individuals. In the Progressive Era (1890s–1920s) of the United States, an intense form of adversarial journalism was practiced where journalists revealed wrongdoings and corruption within the government, business and established institutions, often through sensationalist publications. U.S. President Theodore Roosevelt referred to them in 1906 as "muckrakers".

After the second world war, according to American political scientist Donald R. Matthews, media was deemed "overcooperative" regarding their relationship with the US Congress. According to historian Julian Zelizer, the press treated the political establishment with respect until the mid-1960s. According to American journalism academic Carl Sessions Stepp, in this "pre-Watergate, pre-Vietnam, pre-Dealey Plaza world", the journalists appear "naively trusting of government, shamelessly boosterish, unembarrassedly hokey and obliging", as they simply acted as messengers of "an unquestioned, quasi-official sense of things."  

Starting in the late 1960s, and into the 1970s, adversarial journalism regained strength and interest as journalists covered the Civil Rights movement, the protests against the Vietnam war and the Watergate scandal that culminated in the resignation of U.S. President Richard Nixon. According to historian Matthew Pressman, between 1960 and 1980, "interpretation replaced transmission, and adversarialism replaced deference." According to Jill Lepore, a staff writer at The New Yorker magazine, this was partially due to the desire to offer something different than television, and partially a consequence of McCarthyism. Neo-conservative journalist Irving Kristol wrote in 1967 that while it is commendable to keep a reporter's prejudices out of a story, but when the same reporter refuses to give their judgment on that story, the truth is "emasculated".

In a paper presented in 1989, professor of media and communication Jian-Hua Zhu presented a differentiation model to show different kinds of adversarial attitudes of individual American journalists and journalistic organizations (which are bureaucratic enterprises governed by commerce and routine activities) towards powerful individuals (such as high-ranked public officials and corporate executives), organizations (such as legislating bodies, executive departments, courts, political parties and big corporations) and the "System" (i.e. the state) as a whole. According to Zhu, in the U.S., individual journalists are strongly adversarial towards powerful individuals, but moderately and mildly adversarial when it comes to powerful organizations and the System, respectively. Journalism organizations are, for Zhu, moderately adversarial to powerful individuals, mildly adversarial to powerful organizations, and not at all adversarial towards the System. In other words, adversarial journalists fight against the "bad guys" of power, but almost never criticizes the System which they view as inherently "good". Zhu noted that according to a survey published by Weaver and Wilhoit in 1988, compared to other roles such as the disseminator role and the interpretive role, the adversarial role was the least popular role among American journalists. 

Contrary to the concerns from critics of adversarial journalism, currently American journalists with an adversarial journalistic propensity constitute a small minority. In a 2007 The American Journalist survey, it was found that while 82% of journalists considered the investigation of government claims as extremely important, only 18% deemed it extremely important to be adversarial toward the government. According to Bill Keller, striving for "fairness" in writing is a relatively modern norm in American journalism and not so long ago, openly opinionated journalism was much more commonplace.

See also
 Advocacy journalism
 Alternative journalism
 Campaigning journalism
 Fourth estate
 Interpretive journalism
 Investigative journalism
 Journalism of attachment
 Partisan journalism
 Press Freedom Index
 Watchdog journalism

References

Types of journalism